WYTJ is a non-commercial and non-profit Christian music radio station licensed to Linton, IN. It is owned by Bethel Baptist Church. WYTJ broadcasts at a frequency of 89.3 MHz with 1,400 watts of power using a non-directional antenna pattern. The Federal Communications Commission considers WYTJ to be a class A FM broadcasting facility. WYTJ stands for "Will You Trust Jesus?". WYTJ is also heard in Vincennes, Indiana through a translator, W201BO, broadcasting on 88.1 FM. In 2021, Bethel Baptist Church purchased 88.9 WVWG in Seelyville, Indiana for $35,000, and it began simulcasting WYTJ.

History
 Station goes on the air, July 29, 2003.
 New transmitter installed, August 19, 2010.
 Station increases power by 400 watts, December 11, 2013.

References

External links
WYTJ Official website

YTJ
Radio stations established in 2004
2021 mergers and acquisitions